Aglaia apiocarpa is a species of plant in the family Meliaceae. It is found in Southern India and Sri Lanka.

Description
Leaves compound, pinnate; lamina broadly elliptic; apex acuminate with blunt tip; base cuneate; with recurved margin. Yellow colored flowers are unisexual and show panicle inflorescence. Fruit is a single-seeded, reddish obovoid berry.

References

apiocarpa
Vulnerable plants
Flora of India (region)
Flora of Sri Lanka
Taxonomy articles created by Polbot